Anle Subdistrict is a subdistrict in Luolong District, Luoyang, Henan province, China. , it has 2 residential communities under its administration.

See also 
 List of township-level divisions of Henan

References 

Township-level divisions of Henan
Luoyang